Muling is a county-level city of Mudanjiang, southeastern Heilongjiang province, China, bordering Russia's Primorsky Krai to the east.

Administrative divisions 
Muling City is divided into 6 towns and 2 townships. 
6 towns
 Bamiantong, Muling, Xiachengzi, Maqiaohe, Xingyuan, Hexi
2 townships
 Fulu, Gonghe

Climate

See also
 Muling River

References

External links
Official website of Muling Government

Cities in Heilongjiang
Mudanjiang